Horizon is the sixth studio album by American musical duo Carpenters. It was recorded at A&M Studios (mainly in Studio "D" using then-state-of-the-art 24-track recording technology, 30 Dolby, and recorded at 30 inches per second). The Carpenters spent many hours experimenting with different sounds, techniques and effects.

After five consecutive albums peaking inside the US top five, Horizon broke this run by only reaching no. 13. The album has been certified Platinum by the RIAA for shipments of 1 million copies. It was particularly successful in the United Kingdom and Japan, topping the charts and becoming one of the best-selling albums of 1975 in those countries. Horizon also reached no. 3 in New Zealand, no. 4 in Canada and no. 5 in Norway.

Overview
The album's first single, "Please Mr. Postman" (released some seven months earlier), became the album's biggest hit single and also the Carpenters' biggest hit single worldwide. It reached no. 1 in the United States, Australia, New Zealand, Canada and South Africa, as well as reaching no. 2 in the UK and Ireland. This tune features Karen on drums and Tony Peluso on guitar solo. The following single, "Only Yesterday", was also a success, reaching no. 2 in Canada and France, no. 4 in the US, no. 5 in Ireland, no. 7 in the UK, no. 10 in New Zealand and was certified gold in Japan. The song also won the prestigious Grand Prix award in Japan. A third single, "Solitaire", reached no. 17 in the US and the top 40 in several other countries around the world. According to Richard, Karen never particularly liked the song. The Carpenters' version of this song leaves out lyrics included in the original.

"Desperado" was originally recorded by Eagles in 1973 for the album of the same name. Several others have recorded this song, including Linda Ronstadt, Bonnie Raitt, and Kenny Rogers. Because the song was already well-known, A&M decided not to release the song as a single. Another cover, "I Can Dream, Can't I" is an interpretation of the 1949 Andrews Sisters hit, and was written in 1937. Karen and Richard hired Billy May, who has worked with artists such as Frank Sinatra and Nat King Cole, to help orchestrate the song. The song features the Billy May Orchestra. John Bahler is in the chorus of background singers.

At the time of the release of Horizon, lyricist John Bettis claimed "(I'm Caught Between) Goodbye and I Love You" to be his and Richard's best collaboration.

Reception

Rolling Stone reviewer Stephen Holden acclaimed Horizon, calling it "the Carpenters' most musically sophisticated album to date." However, AllMusic gave the album a less enthusiastic review and cited flaws despite a good production.

Re-packaged release
Horizon was re-issued as a CD in 1996 with the track list and running order intact by the Belgium label ARC Records (not to be confused with the American label of the same name), retitled simply The Carpenters and with an entirely different cover design.

Track listing

Personnel
Karen Carpenter – vocals, drums
Richard Carpenter – keyboards, ARP synthesizer, vocals
Joe Osborn – bass guitar
Jim Gordon – drums
Tony Peluso – guitar
Bob Messenger – tenor saxophone
Doug Strawn – baritone saxophone
Earl Dumler – oboe, English horn
Thad Maxwell, Red Rhodes – pedal steel guitar
Tommy Morgan – harmonica
Gayle Levant – harp
Bernie Grundman, Richard Carpenter – remastering at Bernie Grundman Mastering

Although percussion is audible on some of the songs, notably "Only Yesterday", it is not specified who the percussionist is, but this would change with the experimental album Passage, released in 1977.

Engineers: Roger Young, Ray Gerhardt
Assistant engineer: Dave Iveland

Photography: Ed Caraeff

Arranged, orchestrated and conducted by Richard Carpenter

"I Can Dream, Can't I?" featured guest performances by:
 Bass: Joe Mondragon
 Drums: Alvin Stoller
 Keyboards: Pete Jolly
 Vibes: Frank Flynn
 Guitar: Bob Bain

Singles
"Please Mr. Postman" US 7" single (1974) – A&M 1646
"Please Mr. Postman"
"This Masquerade"

"Only Yesterday" US 7" single (1975) – A&M 1677
"Only Yesterday"
"Happy"

"Solitaire" US 7" single (1975) – A&M 1721
"Solitaire"
"Love Me for What I Am"

Charts

Weekly charts

Year-end charts

Certifications

References

1975 albums
The Carpenters albums
A&M Records albums
Albums arranged by Billy May
Albums conducted by Billy May
Albums recorded at A&M Studios